Sunny Side Up is a 1926 American silent comedy film directed by Donald Crisp and starring Vera Reynolds, Edmund Burns, and George K. Arthur.

It is also known by the alternative title of Footlights. It is based on the novel Sunny Ducrow by Henry St. John Cooper.

Cast
 Vera Reynolds as Sunny Ducrow  
 Edmund Burns as Stanley Dobrington  
 George K. Arthur as Bert Jackson  
 Zasu Pitts as Evelyn 
 Ethel Clayton as Cissy Cason  
 Louis Natheaux as Stanley's Assistant  
 Sally Rand as A Dancer  
 Jocelyn Lee as Showgirl  
 Majel Coleman as Showgirl

References

Bibliography
 Charles Stumpf. ZaSu Pitts: The Life and Career. McFarland, 2010.

External links

1926 films
1926 comedy films
Silent American comedy films
Films directed by Donald Crisp
American silent feature films
1920s English-language films
Producers Distributing Corporation films
American black-and-white films
1920s American films